Alaimus is a genus of nematode belonging to the family Alaimidae.

The genus was first described by J. G. de Man in 1880.

The genus has cosmopolitan distribution.

Species:
 Alaimus primitivus de Man, 1880

References

Nematodes